Stenocotis depressa is a species of leafhoppers in the family Cicadellidae.

References

Ledrinae